What Love Is All About is the eighth studio album by Canadian country music artist Johnny Reid. It was released on November 13, 2015 via Universal Music Canada. The album includes the singles "A Picture of You" and "Honey Honey".

Track listing

Charts

Weekly charts

Year-end charts

Singles

Certifications

References

2015 albums
Johnny Reid albums
Universal Music Canada albums
Albums produced by Bob Ezrin
Albums recorded at Noble Street Studios
Juno Award for Adult Contemporary Album of the Year albums